John Paul Hempel (Salt Lake City, Utah, October 14, 1935 ─ Rice Lake, Wisconsin, January 13, 2022) was an American mathematician specialising in geometric topology, in particular the topology of 3-manifolds and associated algebraic problems, mainly in group theory.

Early life and career 
Hempel was born in Salt Lake City, Utah. In 1957 he graduated from the University of Utah with a degree in mathematics. In 1962, he defended his thesis at the University of Wisconsin-Madison, under the supervision of R. H. Bing. He was a professor at Rice University until the time of his death.

He was married to Edith, whom he married on September 1, 1965, in Houston, Texas. He had 1 son and 3 grandchildren.

Outside of mathematics, Hempel was a nature enthusiast. As a child he was adventurous, and taught himself to mountain bike. He was also fascinated by camping, climbing, skiing and boating. In addition, he knew how to play the piano. In 2013, Hempel was elected a fellow of the American Mathematical Society.

Hempel showed that the fundamental groups of 2 manifolds are residually finite. He also introduced the study of the curve complex into 3-manifold topology. 

Hempel wrote a book called 3-manifolds in 1976. His research was in topology.

References 

1935 births

2022 deaths
20th-century American mathematicians
Topologists
Rice University faculty
University of Utah alumni
Mathematicians from Utah